Drinking and Wenching is a compilation album by The Dubliners released in 1976.

Track list
 "Seven Drunken Nights"
 "A Pub With No Beer"
 "Poor Old Dicey Riley"
 "Sullivan's John"
 "Maid Of The Sweet Brown Knowe"
 "Black Velvet Band"
 "Limerick Rake"
 "Maids When You're Young Never Wed an Old Man"
 "Quare Bungle Rye"
 "Maloney Wants A Drink"
 "Zoological Gardens"
 "Nancy Whiskey"

References

The Dubliners compilation albums
1976 albums
Transatlantic Records albums